Teiko Kiwa (November 20, 1902 – May 29, 1983, 喜波貞子 in Japanese), born Laetitia Jacoba Wilhelmina Klingen, was a Japanese-Dutch opera singer and actress. She was known as "the Japanese Duse", a reference to Italian actress Eleanora Duse.

Early life 
Klingen was born in Yokohama, the daughter of a Dutch official, Hermanus Klingen, and dressmaker Tsuru Antonia Klingen; her maternal grandmother was Japanese. She moved to Italy in 1920, to train as a singer.

Career 
Kiwa (also known as Sadako Kiba) specialized in playing Japanese opera roles, including Cio-Cio San in Puccini's Madama Butterfly, wearing her own authentic kimonos and accessories, rather than the usual European costumes. She starred in Madama Butterfly in her professional debut in 1922, at the Teatro Nacional de São Carlos in Lisbon. She was the first Japanese woman to sing the role at the Polish National Opera, and at the Finnish National Opera and Ballet, and the second to sing the role in Brazil. She also sang the role in many other European cities, including Rome and Vienna. "The exquisite Japanese soprano proved herself beyond dispute the most impassioned actress who has ever interpreted this role," wrote one reviewer in 1926. 

She also played Norina in Don Pasquale and Mimi in La bohème. She made recordings for the Victor label in the 1930s. In April 1927, she was described as "the only singer who dares to travel by areoplane." She appeared on the covers of the American magazine Musical Courier in August and September 1927.

Personal life and legacy 
Kiwa married Czesław Rawita-Proszowski, a Polish tenor who was also her manager. After World War II, she moved to Nice, and taught singing. Her husband died in 1973, and she died in Nice in 1983, aged 80 years. In 1990, a documentary aired on Japanese television, titled "Mrs. Chocho: Opera Singer Sadako Kiba's Life", and a CD of her recordings was released. Her remains were returned to Yokohama in 2003. Materials related to her career were part of an exhibit at the Polish National Opera in 2016.

References

External links 

 A recording of Teiko Kiwa singing, on YouTube
 "Die japanische Opernsängerin Teiko Kiwa", a photograph taken about 1930, at Getty Images

1902 births
1983 deaths
Dutch people of Japanese descent
Japanese women opera singers
People from Yokohama